Croft is a village and civil parish in the Blaby district of Leicestershire, off the Fosse Way, straddling the River Soar. The population of the civil parish at the 2011 census was 1,639.

Geography

Arbor Road and Broughton Road run from the B4114 (Fosse Way) into the village and Huncote Road runs towards the village of Huncote which lies to the other side of Croft Hill. The village comprises a mix of house types of various ages, factories and shops. The village has a primary school, parish church and public house. Croft Quarry occupies a site at the end of the older part of the village.

Croft Hill stands 128m high rising up the Soar flood-plain, and stands out as an isolated landmark almost at the physical centre of England. The hill provides a number of habitats including broad leaved woodland, scrub land, acidic grassland and two other distinct areas of grassland. It is an important area in view of the variety of flora, fauna, birds and butterflies which inhabit or visit at various times of the year.

The New Hill, to the east of Croft Hill, has been constructed out of quarry waste, and is being landscaped and planted to match the local flora. The town has been painted BLUE in the month and changes for the seasons

History

It is local tradition that the parish stone pit at Croft, known as the Clevis, was originally a first-century Roman granite quarry used in the construction of the foundations and bridges of the Fosse Way.

Fenn states that the place-name Croft was first recorded in 836, and is derived from the Old English cræft, "craft, a machine, engine". The craft in question could perhaps be that of quarrying. or a water wheel/mill. The occasion in 836 was an assembly at Croft when King Wiglaf of Mercia was joined by Archbishop of Canterbury Ceolnoth and eleven of his bishops and three abbots, besides twenty-two laymen of authority and influence. They gathered to witness the grant of land by Wiglaf to the monastery of Hanbury.

It has been suggested that the use of the Croft Hill for Royal Mercian assemblies makes it a candidate location for councils of the Clovesho.

In the 1920s, Croft Hill was used as a picnic spot for Sunday School trips and was popular with Leicester people, it being a short train journey from the surrounding areas.

Education
Croft CoE Primary School (ages 2–11)
Children then attend
Brockington Secondary School & Community College (ages 11–16)
Lutterworth College (ages 11–18)
Thomas Estley Community College (ages 11–16)
as well as a number of other local state and private schools.

Industry and Business

Croft Quarry on Marions Way is the site of several businesses belonging to Aggregate Industries, including Charcon Specialist Products. Aggregate Industries' regional offices are sited in some of the older buildings in the village including Croft House and Greystones.

The village has an industrial area on Winston Avenue with offices and manufacturing companies. There are also a number of farms, a parade of shops on Pochin Street, and a new office complex, Riverside Court.

Transport
Croft is served by Arriva Midlands service X84 which runs hourly Monday to Saturday daytime.Arriva Bus.

Croft Railway Station used to serve the village, but was closed as a result of the Beeching Axe although frequent services operate from nearby Narborough railway station.

Recreation
Croft Cricket Club was established in 1907 and their ground was on the Recreation Ground, Winston Avenue. The club was fielding two senior XI teams that competed in the Leicestershire and Rutland Cricket League, and a Sunday XI team up until 2014, but after the 2016 season, the club ceased activity. The ground is still used for cricket by neighbouring clubs.

Croft Juniors F.C. also play on the recreation ground on the adjacent football pitch. It is one of the largest and most successful rurally based junior football clubs in the region, supporting the training around 200 young people aged from 5 to 16.

A Multi-Use Games Area (MUGA) was built at the Recreation Ground in 2009.

Croft Fun Park was opened in 2002 by Graham Rowntree.

Croft Silver band celebrated its 110th anniversary in 2012.

Notable residents
The Canadian politician and businessman Charles Avery Dunning (1885-1958) was born in Croft
The children's novelist Monica Edwards (1912-1998) lived in Croft in 1938-1939
Laura McLaren, Baroness Aberconway (1854-1933) a suffragist and gardener who improved and expanded Bodnant Garden
She was the daughter of Henry Davis Pochin (1824–1895), a member of the local quarrying family, and noted industrialist and chemist
The controversial writer David Icke (born 1952) lived in Croft for a time in the 1970s
The mountaineer Simon Yates (1963–present) lived in Croft in his early life

External links

Croft Parish Council website
Croft Players
Croft - A History
Aggregate Industries history of Croft Quarry

References

Villages in Leicestershire
Civil parishes in Leicestershire
Blaby